Benjamin Vogt (born 28 June 1999) is a Liechtensteiner footballer who plays as a left-back for Balzers and the Liechtenstein national team.

Career
Vogt made his international debut for Liechtenstein on 28 March 2021 in a 2022 FIFA World Cup qualification match against North Macedonia.

Career statistics

International

References

External links
 
 Benjamin Vogt at LFV.li 

1999 births
Living people
Liechtenstein footballers
Liechtenstein youth international footballers
Liechtenstein under-21 international footballers
Liechtenstein international footballers
Association football fullbacks
FC Balzers players
FC Vaduz players
Swiss 1. Liga (football) players
2. Liga Interregional players